Cystatin-A is a protein that in humans is encoded by the CSTA gene.

The cystatin superfamily encompasses proteins that contain multiple cystatin-like sequences. Some of the members are active cysteine protease inhibitors, while others have lost or perhaps never acquired this inhibitory activity. There are three inhibitory families in the superfamily, including the type 1 cystatins (stefins), type 2 cystatins, and kininogens. This gene encodes a stefin that functions as a cysteine protease inhibitor, forming tight complexes with papain and the cathepsins B, H, and L. The protein is one of the precursor proteins of cornified cell envelope in keratinocytes and plays a role in epidermal development and maintenance. Stefins have been proposed as prognostic and diagnostic tools for cancer.

Interactions
Cystatin A has been shown to interact with Cathepsin B and CTSL1.

See also
 Peptide Transporter Carbon Starvation (cstA) Family

References

Further reading

External links
 Cystatin: a protein that flips out! QUite Interesting PDB Structure article at PDBe
 The MEROPS online database for peptidases and their inhibitors: I25.001